The following is a list of ambassadors that the United States has sent to Chile.  The current title given by the United States State Department to this position is Ambassador Extraordinary and Minister Plenipotentiary.

See also
Ambassadors of the United States
Chile–United States relations
Foreign relations of Chile
Joel Roberts Poinsett

References
United States Department of State: Background notes on Chile

External links
 United States Department of State: Chiefs of Mission for Chile
 United States Department of State: Chile
 United States Embassy in Santiago

Chile
 
United States